Tseung Kwan O Chinese Permanent Cemetery, also referred to as Junk Bay Chinese Permanent Cemetery is a cemetery in Tiu Keng Leng (Rennie's Mill), Hong Kong. It is managed by The Board of Management of the Chinese Permanent Cemeteries. The term 'Permanent' refers to the cemetery site, not the graves.

Location
Tseung Kwan O Chinese Permanent Cemetery lies on the slopes of Chiu Keng Wan Shan, eastwards of Devil's Peak. It faces the bay of Tseung Kwan O (aka. Junk Bay).

Notable burials
 Danny Chan (1958–1993), pop singer
 Wong Ka Kui (1962–1993), singer and musician
 Sun Ma Sze Tsang (1916–1997), opera singer and actor

See also
 List of cemeteries in Hong Kong

References

External links
 

Cemeteries in Hong Kong
Tiu Keng Leng